Drip Drop may refer to:

 "Drip Drop" (Safura song), a 2010 song by Azerbaijani singer Safura Alizadeh
 "Drip Drop" (Leiber and Stoller song), a 1958 song performed by The Drifters and also Dion
 "Drip Drop", a song on the album V by Vanessa Hudgens

See also
 Drip (disambiguation)
 Drop (disambiguation)